The Coast Patrol is a 1925 silent film action drama directed by Bud Barsky and starring Kenneth MacDonald with an early appearance by Fay Wray. A good example of an independent programmer picture.

Prints held at Cineteca Del Friuli, Germona,  UCLA Film and TV, and the Library of Congress.

Cast

References

External links

1925 films
American silent feature films
1925 drama films
Silent American drama films
American black-and-white films
1920s American films